N. Deepal Gunasekara is a Sri Lankan politician and a former member of the Parliament of Sri Lanka.

References

Living people
Sri Lankan Buddhists
1967 births
Members of the 13th Parliament of Sri Lanka
Janatha Vimukthi Peramuna politicians
Jathika Nidahas Peramuna politicians
United People's Freedom Alliance politicians